Gandzia is a Ukrainian folk song. It was composed by Denis Fedorovich Bonkovsky ("Денис Федорович Бонковський") in the 19th century and was included in Semyon Tchernetsky's 1938 Trot-March.

References 

Ukrainian songs
Ukrainian folk songs
Russian military marches
Military marches